The 2021 ARCA Menards Series West was the sixty-eighth season of the ARCA Menards Series West, a regional stock car racing series sanctioned by NASCAR in the United States. The season began at Phoenix Raceway with the General Tire 150 and ended with another race at Phoenix Raceway, the Arizona Lottery 100, on November 6.

Teams and drivers

Complete schedule

Limited schedule

Notes

Changes

Teams
 On December 16, 2020, it was revealed in an article on the ARCA website that Bridget Burgess would attempt to run the full season in the West Series in 2021. She ran most of the races in 2020 (all of them except the doubleheader at UMC).
 On January 4, 2021, Bill McAnally Racing announced their 2021 driver lineup, with defending series champion Jesse Love moving from the closed No. 19 car to the No. 16, replacing Gio Scelzi, and rookie Cole Moore driving the No. 20 (it would later be changed to the No. 99). The team cut back from 4 full-time cars to 2 in 2021, which left Scelzi and Holley Hollan (who drove the closed No. 50 car) without rides in 2021. They also had a 5th full-time car to start the 2020 season, the No. 12 of Lawless Alan, which was closed down mid-season. Gracie Trotter, who drove the No. 99 in 2020, left the team to move up to the main ARCA Series in 2021, driving for Venturini Motorsports.
 On February 2, 2021, it was announced that High Point Racing, a late model racing team in the Spears Southwest Tour, would expand to the West Series in 2021, fielding the No. 51 for rookie Dean Thompson, their driver in that series in 2020. They formed an alliance with Sunrise Ford Racing to help get their new team off the ground.
 Stewart-Haas Racing returned to the series for the race at Sonoma to field a car for Chase Briscoe, their Cup Series driver, in preparation for Briscoe's first Cup Series start at the track the next day. In the race, the team used a Ford that was owned by Chad Bryant, the former owner of Chad Bryant Racing who closed his team down and merged it into GMS Racing where he became a crew chief.

Drivers
 On November 2, 2020, it was announced that Jack Wood, who drove part-time in the West Series in 2019 and 2020 for his own team, the No. 78 Toyota for Velocity Racing, would join GMS Racing to replace two-time consecutive East Series champion Sam Mayer in the team's No. 21 car, running full-time in the East Series as well as the Showdown races in the big ARCA Menards Series in 2021. Mayer moved up to the Xfinity Series in June 2021, driving for JR Motorsports after turning 18 and therefore becoming eligible to race in the series. Despite this, Velocity Racing would continue as a part-time team, and the team entered the last two races of the season with Travis Milburn driving the No. 78 car in a collaboration with Kart Idaho Racing, the team he previously drove for.
 On January 18, 2021, it was announced that Blaine Perkins, who drove the No. 9 for Sunrise Ford Racing in 2020 and finished second in the standings, would move up to the Xfinity Series in 2021, driving part-time for Our Motorsports. Rookie driver Jake Drew replaced Perkins in the SFR No. 9.
 On January 20, 2021, it was announced that Takuma Koga, who drove the No. 77 for Performance P-1 Motorsports in 2019 and 2020, would be moving to Jerry Pitts Racing in 2021 to drive their No. 7 in 2021.
 On May 14, 2021, it was announced that former JR Motorsports late model racing driver Adam Lemke would make his stock car debut in 2021, competing in select main ARCA Series, East Series, and West Series races for Rette Jones Racing. (Lemke would end up only running 1 main ARCA Series race for the team and no West Series races,) even though ARCA East driver Max Gutiérrez would attempt the season finale at Phoenix for RJR.
 On March 2, 2021, it was announced that Tony Toste would return to the series full-time for the first time since 1998 and would drive for Performance P-1 Motorsports, replacing Koga in the team's No. 77. However, the deal fell apart after just 1 races, as Dave Smith, Nick Joanides, Mariah Boudrieau, Caleb Costner, and Ryan Roulette split the seat time for the rest of the season. Toste did run 1 more West Series race in 2021, which was at Sonoma where he drove the No. 42 for Cook-Finley Racing.
 On August 20, 2021, the day before the second race at Irwindale, Dean Thompson tested positive for COVID-19 and was replaced by Ryan Partridge for that race. Partridge, a former Sunrise Ford Racing driver, made his first start in the series since 2018. SFR has an alliance with Thompson's team, High Point Racing.

Crew chiefs
 On December 16, 2020, it was revealed in an article on the ARCA website that Sarah Burgess, the mother of Bridget Burgess who served as her crew chief in 2020, expressed an interest in stepping off the pit box if possible and potentially racing against her daughter in a West Series race in 2021. (This did not end up happening and Sarah Burgess crew chiefed Bridget in every race in 2021.)
 Both of the crew chiefs for Bill McAnally Racing's full-time cars were new in 2021, with Travis Sharpe crew chiefing Jesse Love's No. 16 and Mario Isola crew chiefing Cole Moore's No. 99. Also, Sharpe would miss the race at Sonoma and was replaced by John Camilleri, who crew chiefed the No. 19 in most races in 2021.
 After having 4 different crew chiefs in 2020, Performance P-1 Motorsports had another new crew chief in 2021, Dave McKenzie.

Manufacturers
 On December 16, 2020, it was revealed in an article on the ARCA website that Bridget Burgess would attempt to buy newer cars and equipment for her family team in 2021, which borrowed an old 2007 Toyota from Bill McAnally Racing for their starts in 2020. The team ran a Chevy in every race in 2021.
 On January 20, 2021, it was revealed in the announcement of Takuma Koga joining Jerry Pitts Racing that the team would be switching from Ford to Toyota in 2021. However, they would have a Ford entry for Kyle Keller at the LVMS Bullring.
 Todd Souza's No. 13 team ran both Fords and Toyotas after only running Toyotas in 2020.

Schedule
Sonoma, Las Vegas, and Phoenix revealed their race dates ahead of the release of the entire schedule, which ARCA announced on December 18, 2020.

Note: The race at Phoenix in March was a combination race with the ARCA Menards Series (highlighted in gold).

Results and standings

Race results

Drivers' championship

Notes: 
 The pole winner also receives 1 bonus point, similar to the previous ARCA points system used until 2019 and unlike NASCAR. 
 Additionally, after groups of 5 races of the season, drivers that compete in all 5 races receive 50 additional points. 
 Jesse Love, Jake Drew, P. J. Pedroncelli, Cole Moore, Joey Iest, Todd Souza, Trevor Huddleston, Takuma Koga, Bridget Burgess, and Bobby Hillis Jr. received this points bonus for having competed in the first 5 races of the season (the first race at Phoenix, Sonoma, the first race at Irwindale, Colorado, and the second race at Irwindale). Those ten drivers along with Paul Pedroncelli and Taylor Gray received this points bonus for having competed in the last 4 races of the season (Portland, the Las Vegas Bullring, Roseville, and the second race at Phoenix). 

(key) Bold – Pole position awarded by time. Italics – Pole position set by final practice results or rainout. * – Most laps led. ** – All laps led.

See also
 2021 NASCAR Cup Series
 2021 NASCAR Xfinity Series
 2021 NASCAR Camping World Truck Series
 2021 ARCA Menards Series
 2021 ARCA Menards Series East
 2021 NASCAR Whelen Modified Tour
 2021 NASCAR Pinty's Series
 2021 NASCAR PEAK Mexico Series
 2021 NASCAR Whelen Euro Series
 2021 eNASCAR iRacing Pro Invitational Series
 2021 SRX Series

References

ARCA Menards Series West
ARCA Menards Series West